Herbert Jenner-Fust (14 August 1841 - 11 November 1940) was an English cricketer who played for Gloucestershire County Cricket Club. He was born at Beckenham in Kent in 1841 and died in Falfield in Gloucestershire in 1940 aged 99.

Jenner-Fust made a single first-class appearance for the side, during the 1875 season, against Yorkshire. From the tailend, he scored a single run in the first innings in which he batted, and a duck in the second.

Amongst Jenner-Fust's cricket-playing relatives were his brothers-in-law John Dyke, Percyvall Dyke and Thomas Dyke, his cousin Edwin Dyke, his father Herbert Jenner, his nephew Evan Nepean and his uncles Charles Jenner and Henry Lascelles Jenner.

References

1841 births
1940 deaths
Cricketers from Beckenham
English cricketers
Gloucestershire cricketers